Vardhaman College of Engineering was established in 1999. It is affiliated with Jawaharlal Nehru Technological University, Hyderabad (JNTUH), and was approved by the AICTE, New Delhi. It is accredited by the National Board of Accreditation and also by the National Assessment and Accreditation Council(3.24/4). UGC,  
(university grants commission) awarded autonomous status to the college.

Courses 
It offers graduate and post graduate courses to students.

 B.Tech in
 Computer Science Engineering
 Computer Science Engineering (Artificial Intelligence & Machine Learning)
 Information Technology
 Electronics and Communication Engineering
 Electrical and Electronics Engineering
 Mechanical Engineering
 Civil Engineering
 Aeronautical Engineering

The PG courses include:

 M.Tech in
 Computer Science and Engineering
 Digital Electronics and Communication Systems
 Power Electronics and Electrical Drives
 Engineering Design
 Structural Engineering
 M.B.A. (Master of Business Administration)

Rankings

The National Institutional Ranking Framework (NIRF) ranked it 141 among engineering colleges in 2021.

Campus
The campus is on the outskirts of the city, and has a new auditorium, seminar hall, and library.

References

External links

Engineering colleges in Hyderabad, India
Educational institutions established in 1999
1999 establishments in Andhra Pradesh